Saurita cassandra is a moth in the subfamily Arctiinae. It was described by Carl Linnaeus in his 1758 10th edition of Systema Naturae. It is found in Trinidad, Suriname, Venezuela and Argentina.

References

Moths described in 1758
Taxa named by Carl Linnaeus
Saurita